Pike Run, also known as North Pike Run, is a tributary of Beden Brook in Somerset County, New Jersey in the United States. It is the namesake for the nearby residential development of Pike Run in Belle Mead, New Jersey.

Course
The stream does not have a specific source. One source is at the eastern edge of the Sourland Mountains, while another branch passes through the Pike Brook Country Club(now the Mattawang Golf Club)from its origins on the northeastern edge of the Sourlands. Cruser Brook joins it, and it flows south and joins Back Brook and Pine Tree Run.

Tributaries
Pine Tree Run
Back Brook
Branch Back Brook
Cruser Brook
Roaring Brook

Sister tributary
Rock Brook

See also
List of rivers of New Jersey
Millstone River

References

External links
USGS Coordinates in Google Maps

Tributaries of the Raritan River
Rivers of New Jersey
Rivers of Somerset County, New Jersey